Marrash may refer to:
 Francis Marrash (1835, 1836 or 1837 – 1873 or 1874), Syrian writer
 Maryana Marrash (1848–1919), Syrian writer
 Abdallah Marrash (1839–1900), Syrian writer